The following are the list of Indonesian diplomats that served as Permanent Representative of the Republic of Indonesia to the United Nations Office in Geneva, World Trade Organization, and other international organizations in Geneva.
<onlyinclude>

See also 
 List of Indonesian ambassadors
 List of diplomatic missions of Indonesia
 Indonesia and the United Nations

Reference 

Ambassadors of Indonesia